Norman Barrie Whittingham (born 22 October 1940 in Silsden) is an English former first-class cricketer active 1960–71 who played for Nottinghamshire.

References

External links

1940 births
English cricketers
Nottinghamshire cricketers
Cumberland cricketers
Living people
People from Silsden
Sportspeople from West Yorkshire
20th-century English people